Bangladesh International School, English Section, Riyadh (BISES, Riyadh) is a school located in the Olaya district of Riyadh, Saudi Arabia. It follows the British Curriculum. The school has two sections:
 The Junior section: Grade KG to Grade 2 (coeducation)
 The Secondary/Higher section: Grade 3 to Grade 12 (with separate boys and girls sections)

History
The school was established for students of the Bangladeshi community of Riyadh in the year 1990 to satisfy a perceived need for an English medium school for the Bangladeshi students. It was previously known as "Bangladesh Embassy School" because it was run by the Embassy of Bangladesh in Riyadh. Later, administration and management was handed over to the Bangladeshi parents community. The school is currently run by a board of directors elected from the parents of the school.

Location
The school was originally established as the "English Section" of the (former) Bangladesh Embassy School located on Al Amir Faidal Ibn Turki Ibn Abdul Aziz Street, Hayyal Wazarat. The growing student population necessitated a move to an independent campus in the Sulaimaniya district and hence came to be known as the Bangladesh Embassy School, English Section. The school moved to a newer facility on Khazzan St. to accommodate the ever increasing student body. It was later closed and a new facility on Dabbab Street, Olaya was established.

Special occasions
The school commemorates special days marking Bangladesh's Victory Day and Independence Day, International Mother Language Day and Bengali New Year. Special programs are organized and hosted by the students and the Bengali Culture department. These include poetry, songs, dramas, dances, etc. The school also conducts activities like debates, speech and quran recitations, spelling bee and general knowledge among many other competitions.

Notes

References

Private schools in Saudi Arabia
Cambridge schools in Saudi Arabia
Educational institutions established in 1990
Bangladeshi international schools in Saudi Arabia
International schools in Riyadh
1990 establishments in Saudi Arabia